Rumana Malik Munmun (born May 14) is a Bangladeshi model, actress, dancer, and television anchor. She first came to prominence as a third runner-up at Lux Channel I Superstar in 2006. As a solo host, since 2007 Munmun runs the Bangladeshi television reality show Lux Channel I Superstar.

Early life and education
Rumana Malik Munmun was born on 14 May. She attended a private university. Munmun was married to Toufique Hasan he works as a lecturer at North South University.

Career
She learned classical dance from Bulbul Academy for Fine Arts (BAFA) in Dhaka. She had appeared in several television commercials before started acting career. In 2007, she made her acting debut in the film Daruchini Dip. She runs the popular talk show Amar Ami on Bangla Vision.

Filmography

Television
As actor

As Host
 Spelling Bee
 Chemistry on Maasranga Television (2015)
  Edexcel International GCSE and A Level Examinations in 2015 (2016)
 Shubho Bibaho on Channel I
 Look At Me on Channel I
 Shera Radhuni on Maasranga Television

References

External links
 
 

Living people
21st-century Bangladeshi actresses
Bengali actresses
Bangladeshi film actresses
Bangladeshi television actresses
Bangladeshi female models
Bangladeshi female dancers
Year of birth missing (living people)